Světlá nad Sázavou is a town in Havlíčkův Brod District in the Vysočina Region of the Czech Republic. It has about 6,300 inhabitants.

Administrative parts

Villages and hamlets of Benetice, Dolní Březinka, Dolní Dlužiny, Horní Březinka, Horní Dlužiny, Josefodol, Kochánov, Leštinka, Lipnička, Mrzkovice, Opatovice, Radostovice, Závidkovice and Žebrákov are administrative parts of Světlá nad Sázavou.

Geography
It lies in the Upper Sázava Hills. The Sázava River flows through the town. There are several fish ponds in the municipal territory.

History
The first written mention of Světlá is from 1207. It was founded during the colonization in the second half of the 12th century. Světlá experienced the greatest development during the rule of the Trčka of Lípa family, which acquired it after the Hussite Wars and owned it until 1607. In the 17th century, the glassmaking tradition was founded in Světlá.

Demographics

Economy
The glassmaking tradition continues to this day. Crystal Bohemia, the largest Czech glass company, has owned a local production plant since 2020.

There is a large women's prison in Světlá nad Sázavou. In 2022, its capacity was expanded to 955 convicts.

Sights

The Světlá nad Sázavou Castle is the main sight of the town. It was probably originally a fortress, rebuilt into a castle by Burian Trčka of Lípa in 1567. The castle has a large English park.

The significant landmark of the town is the Church of Saint Wenceslaus with its tower. The most notable house on the square is the town hall built at the turn of the 18th and 19th centuries.

Notable people
Jaroslav Panuška (1872–1958), painter and illustrator; lived here in 1923–1958
Oskar Morawetz (1917–2007), Canadian composer
Martina Krupičková (born 1975), painter

Gallery

References

External links

Cities and towns in the Czech Republic
Populated places in Havlíčkův Brod District